The House of Ibelin was a noble family in the Crusader Kingdom of Jerusalem in the 12th century.  They rose from humble beginnings to become one of the most important families in the kingdom, holding various high offices and with extensive holdings in the Holy Land and Cyprus. The family disappeared after the fall of the Kingdom of Cyprus in the 15th century.

Name
The family took their name from the castle of Ibelin, which was built in 1141 by King Fulk I and entrusted to Barisan, the founder of the family. Ibelin was the crusader's name for the Arab city of Yibna, where the castle was situated. The castle fell to the Saracens at the end of the 12th century, but by then the family had holdings at Beirut and in Cyprus.

First and second family generations

The Ibelin family rose from relatively humble origins to become one of the most important noble families in the Crusader states of Jerusalem and Cyprus. The family claimed to be descended from the Le Puiset viscounts of Chartres in France, though this may be a later fabrication. But much more likely their origin was from Pisa, Italy, the name 'Barisan' widespread in Tuscany and Liguria related to the Azzopardi family. Its first known member, Barisan of Ibelin, was apparently a knight in service of the Count of Jaffa and in the 1110s became constable of Jaffa. As reward for his capable and loyal service, around 1122 he married Helvis, heiress of the nearby lordship of Ramla.

Barisan was given the castle of Ibelin in 1141 by King Fulk as a reward for his loyalty during the revolt of his then master Hugh II of Le Puiset, Count of Jaffa, in 1134. Ibelin was part of the County of Jaffa, which was annexed to the royal domain after Hugh's unsuccessful revolt. Barisan's marriage with Helvis produced Hugh, Baldwin, Barisan, Ermengarde, and Stephanie. The younger Barisan came to be known as Balian. Along with Ibelin, the family then held Ramla (inherited from Helvis), and the youngest son Balian received the lordship of Nablus when he married Maria Comnena, the Dowager Queen. Balian was the last to hold these territories as they all fell to Saladin in 1187.

The family underwent a remarkable rise in status in only two generations. In the circumstances of the crusader kingdom, this rapid rise, noblesse nouvelle, was not as difficult as it would have been in Europe. In crusader Palestine, individuals and whole families tended to die much sooner and replacements, sang nouveau, were needed.

13th century
Balian's descendants were among the most powerful nobles in the Kingdom of Jerusalem and the Kingdom of Cyprus. Balian's first son John of Ibelin, the Old Lord of Beirut, was the leader of the opposition to Emperor Frederick II when the latter tried to impose imperial authority over the crusader states. The family briefly regained control of the castle of Ibelin in 1241 in the aftermath of Frederick's Sixth Crusade, when certain territories were returned to the Christians by treaty. John had numerous children with Melisende of Arsuf, including Balian, lord of Beirut; Baldwin, seneschal of Cyprus; another John, lord of Arsuf and constable of Jerusalem; and Guy, constable of Cyprus. This Balian was married to Eschiva of Montbéliard and was the father of John II of Beirut, who married the daughter of Duke Guy I of Athens. John of Arsuf was the father of Balian of Arsuf, who married Plaisance of Antioch. Guy the constable was the father of Isabella, who married Hugh III of Cyprus.

Balian of Ibelin's second son Philip was regent of Cyprus while his niece, the widowed Queen Alice, needed help to govern. With Alice of Montbéliard, Philip was the father of John of Ibelin, count of Jaffa and Ascalon, regent of Jerusalem, and author of the Assizes of the High Court of Jerusalem, the most important legal document from the crusader kingdom. John married Maria, sister of Hethum I of Armenia, and was the father of James, count of Jaffa and Ascalon and also a noted jurist; and of Guy, count of Jaffa and Ascalon and husband of his cousin Maria, Hethum's daughter.

Several members of the family went to the new kingdom of Cyprus at the beginning of the 13th century. Most of the rest moved there as the mainland kingdom was lost piece by piece. No members of the Ibelin family seem to have gone to any other country during this period. At this time, some of the Embriaco lords of Gibelet, relatives of the Ibelins, also took the name of "Ibelin" because of their common maternal descent.

Despite the family's modest origins on the paternal side, the Ibelins during the 13th–15th centuries were among the highest nobility in the Kingdom of Cyprus, producing brides for younger sons, grandsons and brothers of kings (though the kings and eldest sons tended to find more royal wives). Ibelins lived among the highest circles of Cyprus, and married into the royal family, the Lusignans,  and among such families as Montfort, Dampierre, ducal Brunswick, Montbeliard, and Gibelet(-Ibelins). They married also into other branches of Ibelins. They also had loftier ancestors: Maria Comnena was from the Byzantine imperial Comnenus dynasty, and was descended from the kings of Georgia, Bulgaria, ancient Armenia, Parthia, Persia and Syria.

When the Kingdom of Cyprus was destroyed in the 15th century, the Ibelins apparently also lost their lands and positions, and the family possibly became extinct — the sources, at least, no longer mention them.

Lords of Ibelin
See Lordship of Ibelin.

Barisan of Ibelin (c. 1134–1150)
Hugh of Ibelin (1150–1170)
Baldwin of Ibelin (inherited Ibelin in 1170, but passed it to Balian)
Balian of Ibelin (1170–1193)
John of Ibelin (1193–1236)
Afterwards held directly by the Counts of Jaffa and Ascalon

Family tree
Barisan of Ibelin (d. 1152) m. Helvis of Ramla
 Hugh of Ibelin (c. 1130-1133–1169/1171) m. Agnes of Courtenay
 Baldwin of Ibelin (early 1130s – c. 1187 or 1186/1188) m. 1. Richilde of Bethsan, 2. Isabelle Gothman, 3. Maria of Tripoli
Thomas of Ibelin (before 175 – c. 1188)
Eschiva of Ibelin (c. 1160–1196/1197) m. Amalric of Lusignan

Bourgogne (1180–1210), m. 1. Raymond VI of Toulouse, 2. Gautier II de Montfaucon
Guy, died young
John, died young
Hugh I of Cyprus (1194/1195–1218) m. Alice of Champagne
Mary of Lusignan (before 1215 – c. 1252 or 1254) m. Walter IV of Brienne
Hugh of Brienne (c. 1240–1296) m. 1. Isabella of La Roche, 2. Helena Komnene Dukaina
Walter V of Brienne (c. 1275–1311) m. Jeanne de Châtillon
Walter VI of Brienne (c. 1304–1356) m. 1. Margaret of Taranto, 2. Jeanne of Brienne
Jeanne
Marguerite
 Isabella of Brienne (1306–1360), married Walter III of Enghien
 descendants in Enghien, Kingdom of Naples and Sicily, Duchy of Ferrara, Duchy of Mantua, etc.
Agnes of Brienne m. John, Count of Joigny
Joanna of Brienne m. Niccolo Sanudo
Isabella of Cyprus (1216–1264) m. Henry of Antioch
Hugh III of Cyprus (1235–1284) m. Isabella of Ibelin
 John II of Jerusalem (died 1285)
 Bohemond of Lusignan (ca 1268–1281)
 Henry II of Jerusalem (1271–1324) m. Constanza of Sicily
 Amalric, Prince of Tyre (died 1310) m. Isabella, Princess of Armenia
 Hugh of Lusignan (d. 1318/1323) m. Eschive of Ibelin
 Henry of Lusignan (d. 1323)
 Guy of Lusignan (d. 1344) m. 1. Kantakuzene, 2. Theodora Syrgiannaina
Isabella of Lusignan (c. 1333–1382/1387) m. Manuel Kantakouzenos
 John of Lusignan (d. 1343) m. Sultana of Georgia
 Bohemond of Lusignan (died 1364)
 Leon VI of Armenia (illegitimate) m. Margaret of Soissons
Mary of Lusignan (c. 1370-1381)
Guy of  Lusignan (d. 1405) (illegitimate)
Etienne of Lusignan (illegitimate)
 Bohémond of Lusignan (d. 1344) m. Euphemia of Neghir
 Bartholemy of Lusignan (d. after 1373) (illegitimate)
 Agnes (Mary) of Lusignan (d. aft. 1309) m. Levon III of Armenia
 Mary of Lusignan (1273–1322) m. James II of Aragon
 Aimery of Lusignan (1274/1280–1316)
 Guy of Lusignan (1275/1280–1303) m. Eschiva of Ibelin (1253–1312)
 Hugh IV of Cyprus (c. 1295–1359) m. 1. Maria of Ibelin, 2. Alix of Ibelin
 Guy of Lusignan (c. 1316–1343) m. Marie de Bourbon
 Hugh of Lusignan (1335–1385/1386) m. Maria of Morphou
 Eschiva of Lusignan (c. 1323–1363) m. Fernando of Majorca
 Peter I of Cyprus (1328–1369) m. 1. Eschive de Montfort, 2. Leonor de Gandia
Peter II of Cyprus (c. 1357–1382) m. Valentina Visconti
Margaret or Mary of Lusignan (c. 1360 – c. 1397) m. Jacques de Lusignan
Eschiva of Lusignan (d. before 1369)
 John of Lusignan (c. 1329–1375) m. 1. Constance of Sicily, 2. Alice of Ibelin
 James of Lusignan (d. 1395/1397) m. Margaret or Mary of Lusignan
 John of Lusignan (d. 1428/1432)
 Peter of Lusignan (d. 1451) m. Isabella of Lusignan
 Phoebus of Lusignan (illegitimate)
 Eleanor of Lusignan (d. c. 1414) m. Henry of Lusignan
 Loysia of Lusignan m. Eudes of Lusignan
 James I of Cyprus (1334–1398) m. Helvis of Brunswick-Grubenhagen
 Janus of Cyprus (1375–1432) m. 1. Anglesia Visconti, 2. Charlotte of Bourbon-La Marche
 John II of Cyprus (1418–1458) m. 1. Amadea Palaiologina of Montferrat, 2. Helene Palaiologina
 Charlotte of Cyprus (1442/1443–1487) m. 1. John of Portugal, 2. Louis of Savoy, Count of Geneva
 Cleopha of Lusignan
 James of Lusignan (d. c. 1426)
 Anne of Lusignan (c. 1415/1419–1462) m. Louis of Savoy
descendants in the Duchy of Savoy
 Mary of Lusignan (d. 1437)
 Aloysius of Lusignan (1408–1421) (illegitimate)
 Guy of Lusignan (d. after 1433) (illegitimate) m. Isabelle Babin
 Jacqua of Lusignan (b. 1432)
 Eleanor of Lusignan (b. 1433)
 unknown daughter, m. Garceran Suarez de los Cernadilla
 Philip of Lusignan (d. c. 1430)
 Lancelot of Lusignan (d. after 1450)
 Henry of Lusignan (d. 1427) m. Eleanor of Lusignan
 Eudes of Lusignan (d. 1421) m. Loysia of Lusignan
 Hugh Lancelot of Lusignan (d. 1442)
 Guy of Lusignan
 unknown daughter (d. 1374)
 James of Lusignan (d. c. 1397)
 Eschiva of Lusignan (d. after 1406) m. Sclavus von Asperg
 Marie of Lusignan (1381–1404), married Ladislaus of Naples
 Agnes of Lusignan (c. 1382–1459)
 Isabella of Lusignan m. Peter of Lusignan
 Thomas of Lusignan (d. 1340)
 Peter of Lusignan (d. 1353)
 Margaret of Lusignan, m. Gautier of Dampierre
 Isabella of Lusignan (1296/1300 – after 1340) m. Eudes of Dampierre
 Margaret of Lusignan (c. 1276–1296) m. Thoros III of Armenia
Levon III of Armenia (c. 1287–1307) m. Agnes of Lusignan
 Alice of Lusignan (1277/1280–1324) m. Balian of Ibelin
 Helvis of Lusignan (died 1324) m. Hethum II of Armenia
 Isabella of Lusignan (c. 1280–1319) m. 1. Constantine of Neghir, 2. Oshin of Armenia
 Henry I of Cyprus (1217–1253) m. 1. Alix of Montferrat, 2. Stephanie of Lampron, 3. Plaisance of Antioch
 Hugh II of Cyprus (1252/1253–1267)
Helvis of Lusignan, married Raymond-Roupen of Antioch
Mary of Antioch (1215 – ?) m. Philip of Montfort
John of Montfort (died 1283) m. Margaret of Lusignan
Humphrey of Montfort (died 1284) m. Eschiva of Ibelin
Amaury of Montfort (died 1304)
Rupen of Montfort (died 1313)
a son
Alix or Helvis, living in 1295
Alix, living in 1282 and in 1295
Helvis, living in 1282 and in 1295
Alix, died young

Stephanie of Ibelin m. Amalric, Viscount of Nablus
 Balian of Ibelin (early 1140s – 1193) m. Maria Comnena
 Helvis of Ibelin m. 1. Reginald of Sidon, 2. Guy of Montfort.
Agnes m. Ralph of Tiberias
Fenie (Euphemia) m. Eudes of Tiberias
Balian (d. 1241) m. Margaret of Brienne
Julian Grenier (d. 1275) m. Euphemia of Armenia
Balian II Grenier (d. 1277)
John (d. 1289)
Margaret m. Guy II Embriaco
Philip of Montfort
 John of Ibelin (c. 1179–1236) m. 1. Helvis of Nephin, 2. Melisende of Arsuf
Balian of Beirut (d. 1247) m. Eschiva de Montfaucon
John II of Beirut (d. 1264) m. Alice de la Roche
Isabella of Ibelin (1252–1282) m. 1. Hugh II of Cyprus, 2. Haymo Letrange, 3. Nicholas Laleman, 4. Guillaume Berlais
Eschiva of Ibelin (1253–1312) m. 1. Humphrey of Montfort, 2.  Guy of Lusignan
Amaury of Montfort (d. 1304)
Rupen of Montfort (d. 1313)
Alix of Montfort
Helvis of Montfort
Hugh IV of Cyprus (c. 1295–1359) m. 1. Mary of Ibelin, 2. Alice of Ibelin (see above)
Isabella of Lusignan (1298–1330) m. Eudes of Dampierre
John of Arsuf (c. 1211–1258) m. Alice of Haifa
Balian of Arsuf (1239–1277) m. 1. Plaisance of Antioch, w.o. issue 2. ca 1261 Lucy of Chenechy
John, titular Lord of Arsuf, (1277-1309) m. aft. 1300 Isabel of Ibelin, daughter of Balian seneschal of Cyprus.
 Guy of Ibelin
 Balian of Ibelin (d. c. 1338) m. c. 1320 Margaret of Ibelin
 Philip of Ibelin, (d. 1374/6) m. 1. Eschiva of Dampierre 2. 1355 Alicia of Majorca (d. aft. 1376) daughter of Ferdinand of Majorca
 Guy of Ibelin (d. 1367)
 Thomas of Ibelin (d. aft. 1361)
 John of Ibelin
 Mary of Ibelin (d. aft. 1357) m. 1. c. 1340 Hugh of Dampierre-sur-Salon 2. c. 1349 John of Ibelin (d. aft. 1357)
 Simone of Ibelin (d. aft. 1350) m. 1. c. 1355 Baldwin of Nores 1. John Babin
 Margaret of Ibelin (d. aft. 1353) m. Balian of Ibelin
 Margaret of Ibelin m. c. 1323 Balian of Ibelin
 Lucy of Ibelin m. 1. c. 1332 Baldwin of Milmars 2. c. 1334 Raymond du Four
 Alice of Ibelin
 Joan of Ibelin m. Baldwin of Morf
 Nicole of Ibelin, (d. c. 1300) m. Thibaut of Bessan
 Ermeline of Ibelin
Hugh of Ibelin (1213–1238)
Baldwin of Ibelin (d. 1266) m. Alix of Bethsan
John m. Isabelle Rivet
 Baldwin m. Marguerite de Giblet
 Isabella († 1315), m. her cousin Guy (1286 † 1308) (see below)
 Alix (d. after 1386) m. Hugh IV of Cyprus (see below)
Philip of Ibelin (died 1304), seneshal of Cyprus
Guy m. Mary of Armenia
Balian m. Marguerite Visconte
Hugh (d. 1315)
Melisende, died young
Guy of Ibelin m. Philippa Berlais
 Baldwin bailli of Jerusalem
 John (d. 1277)
 Aimery
 Balian (1240–1302) m. Alice de Lampron
 Guy m. his cousin Isabella (see above)
 Alix (d. after 1386) m. Hugh IV of Cyprus (see above)
 Philip of Ibelin (1253–1318) m. 1. c. 1280 Maria, daughter of Vahran of Hamousse by Mary of Ibelin, w.o. issue; 2. c 1295 Maria of Giblet (d. 1331)
John of Ibelin, (b. 1302, d. aft. 1317)
 Guy of Ibelin (d. c 1360)  m. c. 1319 Margaret of Ibelin
 John of Ibelin
 Alice of Ibelin, (d. aft. 1373) m. c. 1350 John of Lusignan (d. 1375)
 Margaret of Ibelin
 Balian of Ibelin, (d. aft. 1349) m. c. 1323 Margaret of Ibelin
 Isabella of Ibelin, (b.1300, d. aft. 1342) m. 1. 1316 Fernando of Majorca (d. 1316); 2. c. 1320 Hugh of Ibelin
 Helvis of Ibelin, (b. 1307, d. aft. 1347) m. 1330 Henry II, Duke of Brunswick-Grubenhagen (d. 1351)
 Isabella of Ibelin (1241–1324) m. Hugh III of Cyprus (see above)
 Alice m. Eudes of Dampierre sur Salon
 Eschiva
 Melisende
 Mary
 Margaret, m. 1. Hugh of Saint-Omer, 2. Walter of Caesarea.
 Philip of Ibelin (1180–1227), m. Alice of Montbéliard
John of Ibelin (1215–1266) m. Maria of Barbaron
 James (c. 1240–1276) m. Marie of Montbéliard
 Philip (d. aft. 1263)
 Guy (c. 1250–1304) m. Marie, Lady of Naumachia
Philip of Ibelin (d. 1316)
 Hugh of Ibelin (d. aft. 1335)
 Hugh of Ibelin (d. c 1349); m. 1320 Isabellla of Ibelin (died after 1342)
 Balian of Ibelin (d. c 1352)
Guy of Ibelin (d. c 1363); m. N.
 Balian of Ibelin; m.1352 Marguerite of Ibelin
 John of Ibelin (d. c 1375)
 Mary of Ibelin; m. ca 1358 Reinier Le Petit
 Balian of Ibelin, (b. 1302), m. 1. 1322 Jeannette of Montfort (d. c 1325) 2. 1325 Margaret du Four
 Maria of Ibelin, (b. 1294, d. before 1318),  m.1307/10 Hugh IV of Cyprus
 John (died 1315/1316 in Kyrenia)
 John (d. aft. 1263)
 Hethum
 Oshin
 Margaret (c. 1245 – aft. 1317)
 Isabella (c. 1250 – aft. 1298) married Sempad of Servantikar
 Mary (d. aft. 1298) m. 1. Vahran of Hamousse, 2. Gregorios Tardif
 Ermengarde of Ibelin (d. 1160/1167)
 Stephanie of Ibelin (d. after 1167)

The Ibelin crest

The Ibelin shield shown here was used in the film, "Kingdom of Heaven", but has nothing to do with the real Ibelin family. While researching shields and coats of arms for the film (which used real and fabricated shields), members of the production team discovered this shield - a red cross on a gold field - in a museum in Paris, with "Balian 1180" written under it. They were delighted, even though it wasn't "their" Balian, and used it as the Ibelin shield, despite it having no historic connection to that family. This information can be found in the "Kingdom of Heaven" companion book.

Jean de Joinville in his account of the Sixth Crusade mentions the coat of arms of the Count of Jaffa, who at this time was John of Ibelin. Jeanville describes the coat of arms as "or with a cross of gules patée", which roughly translates to "red cross patty on golden ground". That would mean the shield shown here is not that far off from the description given by Jean de Joinville. It remains unclear within the source, if it was the coat of arms of the count of Jaffa, regardless of who was holding that county, or the coat of arms of the house of Ibelin. For Jean de Joinville mentions other Ibelin in his account, but fails to connect them to said coat of arms.

See also
Officers of the Kingdom of Jerusalem
Officers of the Kingdom of Cyprus
Vassals of the Kingdom of Jerusalem

References

Bibliography

, reprint of article Les Ibelin aux XIIIe et XIVe siècles.

External links
 
 
 

 
People of the Crusader states